Arthur George Lee Hellyer (16 December 1902 – 28 January 1993) was a well-known British horticulturalist.

Career

Gardening books and encyclopaedias
In the course of a long public career, Hellyer wrote an extremely large number (over 100) of influential gardening books: one of the first, The Alphabet of Gardening, subtitled a Complete Concise and Comprehensive Guide to Practical Gardening was published in 1927; one of the last, the Hellyer Gardening Encyclopedia, was published in 1993, not long before his death. His titles were often ambitious, but the contents of his books were always as comprehensive as the claims in his 'encyclopaedias', 'directories', 'diaries' and 'guides'. Some of his books covered single plants, such as Chrysanthemums (1958), Roses (1957), Dahlias (1963) and Tomatoes (1954). Some covered specific aspects or problems, as Plant Propagation (1955), Herbaceous Borders (1955), or Garden Pests and Diseases (1964). Others enticed the amateur gardener with titles such as Practical Gardening for Amateurs (1966), or  Starting with Roses (1966). His knowledge was always practical, whatever the subject. Hellyer pioneered the intensive use of illustrations in gardening books, with titles such as Flowers in Colour (1965) and a series of Amateur Gardening Picture Books published by Collingridge.

Noted gardener Vita Sackville-West, in her book Even More For Your Garden, wrote "should you wish for something more elaborate and also more expensive, let me recommend 'Gardens of Britain,' by A. G. L. Hellyer, published by Country Life at 30s. Illustrated by over 200 large photographs, this volume by one of the best and most authoritative writers on gardening matters describes nearly 100 gardens in private ownership but open to the public. It makes a wonderful present either to give or to receive."

Promoting gardening
Hellyer worked for Amateur Gardening magazine from 1929 to 1966, and edited that magazine for 21 years; he also contributed gardening columns to the Financial Times, Country Life magazine, and Homes and Gardens'" magazine. According to Alan Boon, Hellyer asked Thomas W. Sanders "what prospects there were for a young man in horticultural journalism.T.W.S. replied, None whatsoever. I have an assistant who has been with me for 30 years, and when he dies I shall require one replacement. As it happened, Hellyer worked 16 years with the self same assistant (named H.A. Smith) before he retired."

Hellyer was a founder of the Hardy Plant Society.

Notes

Select bibliography

 A.G.L. Hellyer. Amateur Gardening: Pocket Guide. Treasure Press. 4th Edition, 1989. .
 A.G.L. Hellyer. Your Garden Week by Week. Collingridge, 1956.
 A.G.L. Hellyer. Gardening Through the Year. Littlehampton, 1983. .
 A.G.L. Hellyer. Hellyer Gardening Encyclopedia. Hamlyn, 1993. .
 A.G.L. Hellyer. Lawn Care. Hamlyn, 1986. .
 A.G.L. Hellyer. Climbing and Wall Plants. Collins, 1988. .
 A.G.L. Hellyer. Garden Adviser. Macdonald, 1984. .
 A.G.L. Hellyer. Gardening Book. Littlehampton, 1972. .
 A.G.L. Hellyer. Gardens of Genius. Littlehampton, 1980. .
 A.G.L. Hellyer. Illustrated Encyclopaedia of Gardening. Littlehampton, 1982. .
 A.G.L. Hellyer. Gardens to Visit in Britain. Littlehampton, 1970. .
 Thomas William Sanders and A.G.L. Hellyer. The Alphabet of Gardening: a Complete Concise and Comprehensive Guide to Practical Gardening''. Collingridge, ninth edition, 1927.

External links
 Oxford Dictionary of National Biography: A.G.L. Hellyer
 Amateur Gardening (the magazine that Hellyer edited for many years)
 Kiftsgate Court

1902 births
1993 deaths
English horticulturists
Victoria Medal of Honour recipients